The Townsend Farmhouse is a historic residence near Hollywood, Alabama.  The farm is situated at the base of Poorhouse Mountain, and consists of the main house, built circa 1870; a two-room log house, built circa 1860 and today used for storage; and several outbuildings dating from the mid-20th century and later.  The center-hall house has a gable roof, with a tall, cross-gable pediment.  The exterior is clad in clapboard atop the rough-cut limestone block foundation.  Two limestone chimneys project from the gable ends.  The front porch and entry exhibit Folk Victorian details.  A three-bay ell extends from the rear of the house.  The house was listed on the National Register of Historic Places in 2005.

References

National Register of Historic Places in Jackson County, Alabama
Victorian architecture in Alabama
Houses completed in 1870
Houses in Jackson County, Alabama